{{Automatic taxobox
| taxon = Heleococcus
| authority = Korshikov, 1953
| type_species = Heleococcus mucicola
| subdivision_ranks = Species
| subdivision_ref = 
| subdivision = 
 H. mucicola Korshikov
 H. polyvacuolatus Fott
}}Heleococcus'' is a genus of green algae, in the family Palmellaceae.

References

External links

Scientific references

Scientific databases
 AlgaTerra database
 Index Nominum Genericorum

Chlamydomonadales
Chlamydomonadales genera